Ype Juurd Stelma (born 12 January 1936) is a Dutch rower. He competed in the men's coxed four event at the 1960 Summer Olympics. Stelma studied at the University of Leiden, and the Dutch rowing team was the University of Leiden team. He migrated to Norway in 1967 and settled as district physician in Hvaler.

References

External links
 

1936 births
Living people
Dutch male rowers
Olympic rowers of the Netherlands
Rowers at the 1960 Summer Olympics
Sportspeople from Rotterdam
Leiden University alumni
Dutch emigrants to Norway
People from Hvaler